Aleixo-Platini Menga (born 29 September 1987 in Luanda) is a German sprinter, born in Angola.

Biography
His personal best on 200 metres (20.27) is the third best German performance of all-time.

International competitions

†: Did not finish in the final.

See also
 German all-time top lists - 200 metres

References

External links
 
 
 
 
 

1987 births
Living people
German male sprinters
World Athletics Championships athletes for Germany
Angolan emigrants to Germany
Sportspeople from Luanda
Athletes (track and field) at the 2016 Summer Olympics
Olympic athletes of Germany